In mathematics, an algebraic group is an algebraic variety endowed with a group structure which is compatible with its structure as an algebraic variety. Thus the study of algebraic groups belongs both to algebraic geometry and group theory.

Many groups of geometric transformations are algebraic groups; for example, orthogonal groups, general linear groups, projective groups, Euclidean groups, etc. Many matrix groups are also algebraic. Other algebraic groups occur naturally in algebraic geometry, such as elliptic curves and Jacobian varieties.

An important class of algebraic groups is given by the  affine algebraic groups, those whose underlying algebraic variety is an affine variety; they are exactly the algebraic subgroups of the general linear group, and are therefore also called linear algebraic groups. Another class is formed by the abelian varieties, which are the algebraic groups whose underlying variety is a projective variety. Chevalley's structure theorem states that every algebraic group can be constructed from groups in those two families.

Definitions

Examples
The additive group: the affine line  endowed with addition and opposite as group operations is an algebraic group.
The multiplicative group: Let  be the affine variety defined by the equation  in the affine plane .
The special linear group  is an algebraic group: it is given by the algebraic equation  in the affine space  (identified with the space of -by- matrices), multiplication of matrices is regular and the formula for the inverse in terms of the adjugate matrix shows that inversion is regular as well on matrices with determinant 1. 
The general linear group  of invertible matrices over a field  is an algebraic group.
 A non-singular cubic curve in the projective plane  can be endowed with a geometrically defined group law which makes it into an algebraic group (see elliptic curve).

Related definitions

A morphism between two algebraic groups is a regular map  which is also a group morphism.

Quotients in the category of algebraic groups are more delicate to deal with. An algebraic subgroup is said to be normal if it is stable under every inner automorphism (which are regular maps). Note that if the field  is not algebraically closed, the morphism of groups  may not be surjective (the default of surjectivity is measured by Galois cohomology).

Lie algebra of an algebraic group
As a vector space the Lie algebra is isomorphic to the tangent space at the identity element. The Lie bracket can be constructed from its interpretation as a space of derivations.

Alternative definitions

Affine algebraic groups

An algebraic group is said to be affine if its underlying algebraic variety is an affine variety. Among the examples above the additive, multiplicative groups and the general and special linear groups are affine. Using the action of an affine algebraic group on its coordinate ring it can be shown that every affine algebraic group is a linear (or matrix group), meaning that it is isomorphic to an algebraic subgroup of the general linear group.

There are many examples of such groups beyond those given previously: 
orthogonal and symplectic groups are affine algebraic groups. 
unipotent groups. 
algebraic tori. 
certain semidirect products, for instance Jet groups, or some solvable groups such as that of invertible triangular matrices.

Linear algebraic groups can be classified to a certain extent. Levi's theorem states that every such is (essentially) a semidirect product of a unipotent group (its unipotent radical) with a reductive group. In turn reductive groups are decomposed as (again essentially) a product of their center (an algebraic torus) with a semisimple group. The latter are classified over algebraically closed fields via their Lie algebra. The classification over arbitrary fields is more involved but still well-understood. If can be made very explicit in some cases, for example over the real or p-adic fields, and thereby over number fields via local-global principles.

Abelian varieties

Abelian varieties are connected projective algebraic groups, for instance elliptic curves. They are always commutative. They arise naturally in various situations in algebraic geometry and number theory, for example  as the Jacobian variety of a curve.

Structure theorem for general algebraic groups
Not all algebraic groups are linear groups or abelian varieties, for instance some group schemes occurring naturally in arithmetic geometry are neither. Chevalley's structure theorem asserts that every connected algebraic group is an extension of an abelian variety by a linear algebraic group. More precisely, if K is a perfect field, and G a connected algebraic group over K, there exists a unique normal closed subgroup H in G, such that H is a connected linear algebraic group and G/H an abelian variety.

Connectedness

As an algebraic variety  carries a Zariski topology. It is not in general a group topology, i.e. the group operations may not be continuous for this topology (because Zariski topology on the product is not the product of Zariski topologies on the factors).

An algebraic group is said to be connected if the underlying algebraic variety is connected for the Zariski topology. For an algebraic group this means that it is not the union of two proper algebraic subsets.

Examples of groups which are not connected are given by the algebraic subgroup of th roots of unity in the multiplicative group  (each point is a Zariski-closed subset so it is not connected for ). Another non-connected group are orthogonal group in even dimension (the determinant gives a surjective morphism to ).

In addition it is both affine and projective. Thus, in particular for classification purposes, it is natural to restrict statements to connected algebraic group.

Algebraic groups over local fields and Lie groups
This is a group topology, and it makes  into a topological group. Such groups are important examples in the general theory of topological groups.

If  or  then this makes  into a Lie group. Not all Lie groups can be obtained via this procedure, for example the universal cover of SL2(R), or the quotient of the Heisenberg group by an infinite normal discrete subgroup. An algebraic group over the real or complex numbers may have closed subgroups (in the analytic topology) which do not have the same connected component of the identity as any algebraic subgroup.

Coxeter groups and algebraic groups

This is formalized by the field with one element, which considers Coxeter groups to be simple algebraic groups over the field with one element.

See also
Character variety
Borel subgroup
Tame group
Morley rank
Cherlin–Zilber conjecture
Adelic algebraic group
Pseudo-reductive group

References

 
 
 
 Milne, J. S., Affine Group Schemes; Lie Algebras; Lie Groups; Reductive Groups; Arithmetic Subgroups

Further reading 
Algebraic groups and their Lie algebras by Daniel Miller

 
Properties of groups